Fraules Dance Centre is a dance school, located in Novosibirsk, Russia. It was established in 2010.

History
Dance school was founded in Novosibirsk by Elena Yatkina. First the school was called Indigo Dance Centre, then Elena renamed it Fraules.

In May 2014, the Novosibirsk school visited Danielle Polanco.

Dance direction
Dancehall, vogue, hip-hop, house, popping, twerking, break dance, jazz-funk, stretching, locking, contemporary, classical dance.

External links
 Official website

References 

Dzerzhinsky City District, Novosibirsk
Education in Novosibirsk
2010 establishments in Russia
Dance schools